LSV Asset Management (LSV) is an American quantitative investment management firm headquartered in Chicago. The firm provides equity management services for institutional investors.

Background 

LSV was founded in 1994 by Josef Lakonishok, Andrei Shleifer and Robert W. Vishny. The three of them were working in academia where they were Professors in the fields of Economics and Finance. Lakonishok is a professor at University of Illinois at Urbana-Champaign while Shleifer and Vishny are professors at Harvard University and University of Chicago respectively. They focused on the field of behavioral finance. LSV is the first letter of each co-founders surname. SEI Investments Company backed the firm in exchange for a 51% stake.

In 2003, Shleifer sold his entire ownership of the firm and retired from firm to focus on his academic career. In 2006, Vishny reduced his ownership of the firm to 6% and retired from the firm at the end of 2007.

LSV is an active manager that uses a quantitative approach to value investing in the stock market.

The majority of the firm is owned by current and former employees while a minority stake is held by SEI Investments Company.

References

External links
 

1994 establishments in Illinois
Financial services companies established in 1994
Investment management companies of the United States
Privately held companies based in Illinois